Bangladesh has participated all 13 South Asian Games governed by South Asia Olympic Council.

Hosted Games 
Dhaka, the Capital of Bangladesh hosted the South Asian Games 3 times : 1985 South Asian Games, 1993 South Asian Games, 2010 South Asian Games.

Detailed Medal Table

External links 

 http://www.nocban.org/

References 

South Asian Games
 
Nations at the South Asian Games